Red Wine and Blue is the first and only studio album by Australian alternative country band The Dearhunters, which was released in 1999.

Background
The album was recorded in an "old beach shack", in Bundeena by Cameron McCauley in 1999.

Although Whittingham recorded the drum tracks for the album, he was replaced by Dave Ashton, who completed the touring that followed the release of "Red Wine and Blue".

Style
While remaining in the alternative country genre, "Red Wine and Blue" has been described as having a "dreamy" sound, with soft melodies and a melancholic tone. The album is largely built off of dual vocals between Oxley and Phillis.

Reception

Jason MacNeil of Allmusic generally viewed "Red Wine and Blue" as positive, feeling that the album had a few very strong tracks, namely the opening song "Mr. Katherine" and the closing "Alienship". However, he felt that if the album suffered from something, it was that most of the tracks had similar arrangements, and virtually no digressions in composition.

Track listing

Personnel
Greg Hitchcock – guitars
Tim Oxley – vocals, bass
Jodi Phillis – vocals, guitar
Raphael Whittingham – drums

References

1999 albums
The Dearhunters albums